Bradford Aerodrome  is a registered aerodrome located near Bradford, Ontario, Canada.

References

External links
Page about this aerodrome on COPA's Places to Fly airport directory

Registered aerodromes in Ontario